is a Japanese footballer currently playing as a forward for SC Sagamihara.

Career 

Matsuzawa begin first youth career with Nagoya FC, Urawa Red Diamonds until 2016 and Hosei University from 2016 to 2019 until he was graduation from university.

Matsuzawa begin first professional career with Kataller Toyama in 2020. He leave from the club in 3 December 2021 after two years at Toyama been ended.

On 5 February 2022, Matsuzawa transferred to JFL club, Tokyo Musashino United. After expiration contract at Tokyo Musashino United in a season. On 20 December at same year, Matsuzawa officially transfer to J3 club, SC Sagamihara for upcoming 2023 season.

Career statistics

Club 
.

Notes

References

External links

1997 births
Living people
Japanese footballers
Association football forwards
Hosei University alumni
J3 League players
Japan Football League players
Urawa Red Diamonds players
Kataller Toyama players
Tokyo Musashino United FC players
SC Sagamihara players